Peter Gröning (born 29 April 1939) is a former East German track cyclist. Gröning competed for the SC Dynamo Berlin / Sportvereinigung (SV) Dynamo. He won the silver medal at the 1960 Olympics in Rome in the 4000-m team pursuit.

References

1939 births
Living people
German male cyclists
German track cyclists
Olympic cyclists of the United Team of Germany
Cyclists at the 1960 Summer Olympics
Olympic silver medalists for the United Team of Germany
Cyclists from Berlin
Olympic medalists in cycling
Medalists at the 1960 Summer Olympics
East German male cyclists
People from East Berlin